The 1936 Dartmouth Indians football team represented Dartmouth College in the 1936 college football season. The Indians were led by third-year head coach Earl Blaik and played their home games at Memorial Field in Hanover, New Hampshire. The Indians finished with a record of 7–1–1, and in the inaugural year of the AP Poll, finished in 13th in the final rankings.

Schedule

References

Dartmouth
Dartmouth Big Green football seasons
Dartmouth Indians football